The Bell X-22 is an American V/STOL X-plane with four tilting ducted fans. Takeoff was to selectively occur either with the propellers tilted vertically upwards, or on a short runway with the nacelles tilted forward at approximately 45°. Additionally, the X-22 was to provide more insight into the tactical application of vertical takeoff troop transporters such as the preceding Hiller X-18 and the X-22's successor, the Bell XV-15. Another program requirement was a true airspeed in level flight of at least 525 km/h (326 mph; 283 knots).

Design and development
In 1962, the United States Navy announced their request for two prototype aircraft with V/STOL capability, powered by four ducted fan nacelles. Bell Helicopters already had extensive experience with VTOL aircraft and was able to utilize an already developed test mockup.  In 1964 the prototype, internally referred to by Bell as Model D2127, was ordered by the Navy and received the X-22 designation. It was unveiled at an event in Niagara Falls in May 1965.

Three-bladed propellers were mounted on four wings and, synchronized through a wave-interconnection system, were connected to four gas turbines which, in turn, were mounted in pairs on the rear wings. Maneuvering was achieved by tilting the propeller blades in combination with control surfaces (elevators and ailerons), which were located in the thrust stream of the propellers.

Operational history
The maiden flight of the prototype occurred on 17 March 1966. In contrast to other tilt-rotor craft (such as the Bell XV-3), transitions between hovering and horizontal flight succeeded nearly immediately. However, interest increased more towards VTOL and V/STOL properties, not the specific design of the prototype.

Due to failure of a propeller control, described by test pilot Stanley Kakol as the only non-redundant component in the power chain, the prototype crashed on 8 August 1966 and technicians stripped it for components in order to make the second prototype flight capable. The fuselage was still used as a simulator for some time afterwards.

The second X-22 first flew on 26 August 1967. Early that year, it was equipped with a variable flight control and stabilizer system from Cornell Aeronautical Laboratory, which improved flight performance. Although the X-22 was considered to be the best aircraft of its type at the time, the program was canceled. The required maximum speed of 525 km/h was never reached. The second prototype was moved to Cornell Aeronautical Laboratory for further testing; the last flight occurred in 1988.

Surviving aircraft
Although not on display, the only currently remaining craft, 151521, is currently stored by the Niagara Aerospace Museum, New York.

According to the employees at the Museum, the craft was held onto after being debated for scrapping by the Navy.

Specifications (X-22A)

See also

References

Citations

Bibliography

 Apostolo, Giorgio. The Illustrated Encyclopedia of Helicopters. New York: Bonanza Books, 1984. .
 "Bell-X22A: Analysis of a VTOL research vehicle." Flight International, 23 March 1967, p. 445.
 Markman, Steve and Bill Holder. Straight Up: A History of Vertical Flight. Atglen, Pennsylvania: Schiffer Publishing, 2000. .
 Rogers, Mike. VTOL: Military Research Aircraft. New York: Orion Books, 1989. .

External links

aerospaceweb.org

X-22
Tilting ducted fan aircraft
X-22, Bell
Four-engined tractor aircraft
Tandem-wing aircraft
Turboshaft-powered aircraft
Aircraft first flown in 1966